Hengshi is a town in Nankang District, Ganzhou, in southwestern Jiangxi province, China. , it has one residential community and 13 villages under its administration.

References

Township-level divisions of Jiangxi
Ganzhou